Zubčice is a municipality and village in Český Krumlov District in the South Bohemian Region of the Czech Republic. It has about 400 inhabitants.

Administrative parts
Villages of Markvartice and Zubčická Lhotka are administrative parts of Zubčice.

References

External links

Villages in Český Krumlov District